Alec Reid (23 November 1878 – 18 May 1952) was a South African international rugby union player who played as a forward.

He made 1 appearance for South Africa in 1903 scoring a try.

References

1878 births
1952 deaths
South African rugby union players
South Africa international rugby union players
Rugby union forwards
People from Swellendam
Western Province (rugby union) players